Franklin Six (born 29 December 1996 in Ploegsteert) is a Belgian former professional cyclist, who rode professionally between 2015 and 2020, for the  and  teams.

Major results

2016
 8th Rund um den Finanzplatz Eschborn-Frankfurt U23
2017
 2nd Road race, National Under-23 Road Championships
 5th Liège–Bastogne–Liège U23
2019
 10th Paris–Chauny

References

External links

1996 births
Living people
Belgian male cyclists
21st-century Belgian people